Syllepte nyanzana is a moth in the family Crambidae. It was described by Karl Grünberg in 1910. It is endemic to Uganda.

References

Endemic fauna of Uganda
Moths described in 1910
nyanzana
Moths of Africa